Roberto Ruiz Esparza Jr. (born 14 April 1992 in Puebla, Puebla, Mexico) is a professional footballer, currently playing as a forward for Merida in the Ascenso MX.

Professional career
Roberto Ruiz Esparza Jr. was born in Puebla, Puebla, Mexico on 14 May 1992 to former football player Roberto Ruiz Esparza. He spent most of his teen years in the Lobos de la BUAP mainly in the second division club Lobos Prepa, and joining Liga de Ascenso in 2009. In 2012, he was transferred to the first division club Puebla FC.

References

1992 births
People from Puebla (city)
Living people
Mexican footballers
Association football forwards
C.F. Mérida footballers
Lobos BUAP footballers